Box Hill Estate is a national historic district located in St. James in Suffolk County, New York.  The district encompasses an estate that includes five contributing buildings and one contributing structure.  The estate house was the summer home of Stanford White.  It was built in 1885 and is a rambling, multi-gabled structure surfaced in pebblestone dashed stucco.  It features a one-story verandah defined by a range of fluted columns.  Also on the property are a contributing cottage, barn, carriage house, stable, and water tower.

It was added to the National Register of Historic Places in 1973.

References

External links
Box Hill (Old Long Island)

Houses on the National Register of Historic Places in New York (state)
Historic districts on the National Register of Historic Places in New York (state)
Houses completed in 1885
Houses in Suffolk County, New York
Stanford White buildings
National Register of Historic Places in Suffolk County, New York
Stanford White family